(born May 18, 1974, in Fukuoka, Japan) is a retired Japanese backstroke swimmer, who represented her native country at the 1992 Summer Olympics in Barcelona, Spain. She is best known for winning the gold medal in the Women's 200m Backstroke event at the 1995 Summer Universiade in her hometown Fukuoka.

References
 sports-reference

1974 births
Living people
Japanese female freestyle swimmers
Olympic swimmers of Japan
Swimmers at the 1992 Summer Olympics
Japanese female backstroke swimmers
Universiade medalists in swimming
Sportspeople from Fukuoka (city)
Universiade gold medalists for Japan
Universiade silver medalists for Japan
Universiade bronze medalists for Japan
Medalists at the 1995 Summer Universiade
20th-century Japanese women